Colobothea amoena is a species of beetle in the family Cerambycidae. It was described by Gahan in 1889. It is known from Brazil.

References

amoena
Beetles described in 1889